The Krauatungalung are an Indigenous Australian people, of East Gippsland, in the state of Victoria, Australia. They are regarded as a group of the Kurnai, though Tindale states that their inclusion as one of the Gunai is artificial.

Name
According to Alfred William Howitt the ethnonym Krauatungalung is composed of krauat (east) and -galung, a suffix meaning 'of'/'belonging to'. The name they referred to themselves by is Mukdhang, meaning 'good (mak) speech' (ðang).

Country
The Krauatungalung country traditionally encompassed  of tribal territory, from Cape Everard (Point Hicks) to Lakes Entrance. It covers several rivers, the Cann, Brodribb, Buchan, and the Snowy River. Its inland boundary is at the Black Mountain.

Alternative names
 Gunggala-dhang. This was the Bidawal exonym for the Krauatungalung.
 Karnathun. (This was composed of ngatban (no) and ka:nai (man)
 Krauatun-kurnai
 Kroatungolung
 Krow-ithun-koolo
 Krowathun-Koolung
 Muk-dhang
 Thangkwai (Thangguai/Thang quai). This was another exonym, meaning 'rough speech'.

Source:

Notable people
 John Gorrie (born 1950), Aboriginal liaison officer, child protection worker and elder
 Veronica Gorrie (born 1971/1972), writer

Notes

Citations

Sources

Aboriginal peoples of Victoria (Australia)
East Gippsland